John Scott (December 25, 1784 – September 22, 1850) was a member of the U.S. House of Representatives from Pennsylvania.

John Scott (father of Pennsylvania Senator John Scott and of the 1868 candidate for Governor of Florida, George Washington Scott) was born at Marsh Creek, Pennsylvania, near Gettysburg, Pennsylvania.  He moved to Alexandria, Pennsylvania, in 1806 and was engaged as tanner and shoemaker.  He served as major in the War of 1812.  He was a member of the Pennsylvania House of Representatives in 1819 and 1820.

Scott was elected as a Jacksonian to the Twenty-first Congress.  He was an unsuccessful candidate for reelection to the Twenty-second Congress.  He resumed his former business pursuits and retired from business in 1842.  He died in Alexandria, Pennsylvania in 1850.  He was interred in Alexandria Cemetery.

Scott married Agnes Irvine in 1821, Agnes is the namesake of Agnes Scott College in Decatur Georgia.

Sources

The Political Graveyard

1784 births
1850 deaths
Members of the Pennsylvania House of Representatives
American military personnel of the War of 1812
Jacksonian members of the United States House of Representatives from Pennsylvania
19th-century American politicians